Pervertida (Perverted Woman) is a Mexican drama film directed by José Díaz Morales. It was released in 1946 and starring Emilia Guiú and Amalia Aguilar. The film is inspired by the bolero of the same name composed by Agustin Lara.

Plot
By irreparable events of the destiny, Elena (Emilia Guiú) a provincial young, ends up falling into the clutches of perdition and prostitution in Mexico City. The woman reunited with her true love, a musician named Fernando (Ramon Armengod) who has returned to find her. The woman will have to compete for his love with the rumbera Esmeralda (Amalia Aguilar).

Cast
 Emilia Guiú ... Elena
 Ramón Armengod ... Fernando
 Amalia Aguilar ... Esmeralda
 Víctor Manuel Mendoza
 Fanny Schiller
 Kiko Mendive

Reviews
This film was produced by the brothers Guillermo and Pedro Arturo Calderón, experts in tales of "perdition". The film was the presentation in the Mexican Cinema of the Cuban rumbera Amalia Aguilar. In the film, Amalia Aguilar shows her great talent for dancing in a choreographic solo called ¿Donde va María? alongside Kiko Mendive.

References

External links
 

1946 films
Mexican black-and-white films
Rumberas films
1940s Spanish-language films
Mexican drama films
1946 drama films
1940s Mexican films